James Alfred Smith Preston (August 18, 1913 – December 17, 1984), was an American R&B bandleader, alto saxophonist, drummer and singer who made an important contribution to early rock and roll.

Career
Preston was born in Chester, Pennsylvania, and formed his own group in 1945. His first R&B top ten hit was with "Hucklebuck Daddy" in 1949, recorded for Philadelphia's Gotham Records. His main claim to fame was to record, as Jimmy Preston and His Prestonians, the original version of "Rock the Joint" for Gotham in 1949. The sax breaks on "Rock the Joint" were the work of tenor player Danny Turner (1920–1995). "Rock the Joint" was re-recorded by Jimmy Cavallo in 1951, and Bill Haley and the Saddlemen in 1952.

In 1950, tenor saxophone player Benny Golson and pianist Billy Gaines were added to his new line-up and recorded songs like "Early Morning Blues" and "Hayride". Preston moved to Derby Records and had a final R&B hit with a cover of Louis Prima’s "Oh Babe".

Preston gave up playing music in 1952, but as Reverend Dr. James S. Preston, he founded the Victory Baptist Church in 1962. He died in Philadelphia in 1984, aged 71.

References

American rock musicians
Musicians from Philadelphia
Rhythm and blues saxophonists
1913 births
1984 deaths
20th-century American musicians
20th-century saxophonists
Rock and roll musicians
20th-century African-American musicians